This is a list of feature films produced and/or released by DreamWorks Pictures.

1997–1999

2000–2009

2010–2019

2020–present

Upcoming releases

Notes 
 Films released by Touchstone Pictures were distributed through Walt Disney Studios Motion Pictures.
 Films distributed by Mister Smith Entertainment are released under the labels  Reliance Entertainment in India and Entertainment One in the UK and Ireland.

References 

DreamWorks Pictures

DreamWorks Pictures
American films by studio